Lip gloss is a cosmetic used primarily to give lips a glossy luster, and sometimes to add a subtle color. It is distributed as a fluid or a soft solid (not to be confused with lip balm, which generally has medical or soothing purposes, or lipstick, which generally is a solid, cream-like substance that gives off a more pigmented color.) The product is available in ranges of opacity from translucent to solid and can have variously frosted, glittery, glossy, and metallic finishes.

Types
Like lipstick, lip gloss comes in a variety of forms and may be applied in different ways. It can be contained in a small cylinder and applied with a rounded or sloped applicator wand (known as a doe foot applicator) or with a built in lip brush. It can come in a small, soft, squeezable plastic tube designed to be passed over the lips or applied with a fingertip or lip brush. Solid or semisolid glosses come in boxes or tubes and sometimes blur the distinction between lip gloss and lip balm. 

Basic lip gloss simply adds shine to the lips without color. Colored lip gloss adds a combination of color and shine. Glittery lip gloss has a glitter base, with or without color. 

New types of "plumping" lip gloss contain ingredients that make the lips appear softer and plumper. These are a cheap, easy, and usually harmless alternative if compared to collagen, Restylane, Juvederm, or fat injections. They are not as effective, however because the effects are temporary. Plumping lip gloss can also leave a burning sensation on the lips when first applied. 

Lip gloss is often used when a person wants to have some color on their lips, but does not want an intense, solid lip color effect (i.e., a more "made-up" look), as lipstick would create. Lip gloss is also often used as an introduction to makeup. You can find light shimmery lip glosses in many introduction to makeup kits. It is often used by preteen and young teenage girls who want to wear some makeup, but are too young to wear more intense lipstick colors. Lip gloss is also common for young women who don't like to wear makeup but have to attend a formal occasion. Lip gloss can be applied on top of lipstick to increase the gloss of a color, or to add depth as in the case of glitter gloss.

Ingredients
Like lipstick, lip gloss is a mixture of waxes, oils, and pigments. However, lip gloss contains fewer pigments, and those used are often pale in color or diluted (<3%).  Furthermore, the free-flowing nature of the product requires less wax.  The principal components are lanolin, which feels good on the lips due to its moisturizing qualities and imparts gloss, and polybutene.

History
Lip gloss was invented by Max Factor in 1930. He wanted to create a lip product that would make lips shiny and glossy for films. Factor created makeup for the movie industry. He developed makeup specifically for actresses starring in black and white films. Women were inspired by movie actresses to embrace this makeup trend. This led to the popularity of lip gloss. The first commercially available lip gloss was Max Factor's X-Rated, launched in 1932. The original formula was sold until 2003, when Procter and Gamble retired the product.

In 1973, Bonne Bell introduced the first flavored lip gloss, Lip Smackers. Lip Smackers were, and still are, popular among young teenagers. Initially Lip Smackers came in two sizes: small and big. The small ones could be kept in the pocket and the big ones had a rope to hang around the neck. It was advertised that before a date, a teen girl should choose an appropriate flavor because that would be her date's first taste when his lips kissed hers.

Benefit
Emollients – Many different ingredients can be used to make lips feel smooth and add shine. Most formulas use oil (either mineral- or vegetable-based), lanolin derivatives or polybutene (a type of hydrocarbon that mimics silicones). Surprisingly, silicones are not commonly used (silicones are used to add shine and smoothness to many hair and skin care products).

See also
 Lip augmentation
 Lip liner
 Lip stain

References

External links 
 

Cosmetics
Lips